Water supply and sanitation in Istanbul is the responsibility of the public utility ISKI (Istanbul Su ve Kanalizasyon Idaresi) created in 1981.

Water sources

Nearly all of Istanbul's drinking water (97%) comes from surface water collected in reservoirs. Its most important water sources are the Omerli-Darlik system on the Asian side and the Terkos-Alibeykoy system on the European side. Both systems consist of dams, reservoirs, water treatment plants and pipelines. Many of the reservoirs that supply Istanbul are located within the metropolitan area and are exposed to pollution from settlements without adequate sanitation. Water quality is theoretically controlled by conservation zones around the reservoirs which limit construction and industrial activities in four concentric buffer zones with increasingly strict regulations the closer the zones are to the reservoirs. However, there is little enforcement of these regulations in the face of rapid and often unplanned urbanization. Illegal settlements sprang up around the reservoirs, fueled by land speculation. Subsequently they became de facto legalized with their own municipal administrations elected mayors.

Water pollution crisis and response
In 1993/94, a severe water shortage had occurred after health authorities forbade ISKI to use water from the Elmali reservoir because of its high concentration of ammonium caused by the discharge of untreated wastewater into the reservoir. ISKI responded by planning and building new reservoirs located further away from the city and associated water treatment plants and pipelines, notably the Istranca dams in the Black Sea basin on the European side of the Bosphorus, and the Yeşilçay Regulator in the Black Sea basin on the Asian side. With these and other investments the available water supply was increased to 1,170 million m3 per year.

The Melen system
However, given the growth of Istanbul, additional water resources were still needed. Therefore the Melen System is being developed to cover the long term water demand of İstanbul. The first stage supplying 268 million m3 was completed in 2007 with Japanese financing. A second and third stage are expected to bring a total of 1,180 billion m3 for all three phases to meet the water demand of the city until the year 2040, doubling the amount of water supplied prior to the Melen system. Also, a 5.5 km tunnel under the Bosporus will transfer water to the European side. According to monitoring by four metropolitan agencies drinking water quality is good, reportedly surpassing Turkish as well as EU standards. According to a 2004 survey, 35% of customers stated that they drink water from the tap, up from only 10% in 2000. During that period water quality had improved due to network repairs and the completion of new drinking water treatment plants.

Impact of climate change 
Although the data do not indicate a clear declining trend in rainfall, extreme events – especially droughts – seem more pronounced than in the past. In 2006, rainfall of 67 mm was the record low for the previous 50 years, a period during which the average was 257 mm per year. Furthermore, the water level in reservoirs serving the city plummeted to around 25% of full capacity in 2007 and 2008. ISKI, using a scenario of a 2°C temperature increase by 2030, estimated that the city's water supply may decline by as much as 14% over the next two decades because of higher evaporation from reservoirs.

Sanitation
In 2004 Istanbul's wastewater system consisted of 9,602 km of sewers, 17 pumping stations, 7 pre-treatment plants and 5 biological wastewater treatment plants. 95% of the wastewater collected was being treated. Treated wastewaters are discharged into the Bosphorus. They are discharged into the lower layer, where the flow is towards the Black Sea in the North. The Black Sea has a much greater assimilative capacity than the ecologically more sensitive Marmara Sea to the South. For discharges into the Marmara Sea more expensive tertiary treatment is needed, while primary treatment is sufficient for disposal into the Black Sea. The sewer system consists, in principle, of separate sanitary sewers and stormwater drains. However, in reality there are illegal cross-connections so that untreated wastewater reaches the stormwater drains and contributes to the pollution of drinking water reservoirs.

See also
Water supply and sanitation in Turkey
Yeşilçay Drinking Water Plant

References

External links
ISKI - Istanbul water and sewer utility  

Water supply and sanitation in Turkey
Government of Istanbul